In mathematics, the Golod–Shafarevich theorem was proved in 1964 by Evgeny Golod and Igor Shafarevich. It is  a result in non-commutative homological algebra which solves the class field tower problem, by showing that class field towers can be infinite.

The inequality
Let A = K⟨x1, ..., xn⟩ be the free algebra over a field K  in n = d + 1 non-commuting variables xi.

Let J be the 2-sided ideal of A generated by homogeneous elements fj of A of degree dj with 
 
2 ≤ d1 ≤ d2 ≤ ...

where dj tends to infinity. Let ri be the number of dj equal to i.

Let B=A/J, a graded algebra. Let bj = dim Bj.

The fundamental inequality of Golod and Shafarevich states that

 

As a consequence:

 B is infinite-dimensional if ri ≤ d2/4 for all i

Applications
This result has important applications in combinatorial group theory:

 If G is a nontrivial finite p-group, then r > d2/4  where d = dim H1(G,Z/pZ) and r = dim H2(G,Z/pZ) (the mod p cohomology groups of G).  In particular if G is a finite p-group with minimal number of generators d and has r relators in a given presentation, then r > d2/4.
 For each prime p, there is an infinite group G generated by three elements in which each element has order a power of p.  The group G provides a counterexample to the generalised Burnside conjecture: it is a finitely generated infinite torsion group, although there is no uniform bound on the order of its elements.

In class field theory, the class field tower of a number field K is created by iterating the Hilbert class field construction. The class field tower problem asks whether this tower is always finite;  attributed this question to Furtwangler, though Furtwangler said he had heard it from Schreier. Another consequence of the Golod–Shafarevich theorem is that such towers may be infinite (in other words, do not always terminate in a field equal to its Hilbert class field).  Specifically,

 Let K be an imaginary quadratic field whose discriminant has at least 6 prime factors.  Then the maximal unramified 2-extension of K has infinite degree.

More generally, a number field with sufficiently many prime factors in the discriminant has an infinite class field tower.

References
 (in Russian)  
 (in Russian)   
  See Chapter 8. 
 Johnson, D.L. (1980). "Topics in the Theory of Group Presentations" (1st ed.). Cambridge University Press. .  See chapter VI.
 
 
 
 Serre, J.-P. (2002), "Galois Cohomology," Springer-Verlag. . See Appendix 2. (Translation of Cohomologie Galoisienne, Lecture Notes in Mathematics 5, 1973.)

Class field theory
Theorems in group theory